Tangsibji Gewog (Dzongkha: སྟང་སི་སྦྱིས་) is a gewog (village block) of Trongsa District, Bhutan.

References

Gewogs of Bhutan
Trongsa District